Your Choice Live Series Vol. 12 is a live album by American rock band the Melvins, released in 1991 through Your Choice Records. It was recorded on January 23, 1991 at Oberhaus in Alzey, Germany. The band also performed the song "It's Shoved"; it was left off this album but later released on the It's Your Choice compilation.

"Tanked" is an early live version of the song "Wispy" that appears on the Eggnog EP.

Track listing
All songs written by Buzz Osborne.

Personnel
Lorax - bass
Kingbuzzo - vocals, guitar
Daledoe - drums, vocals
Tobby Holzinger - producer

References

Melvins live albums
1991 live albums